Kirkdale TMD is a traction maintenance depot located beside Kirkdale railway station in north Liverpool, England. The depot is the largest on the Merseyrail network; it is located on the Northern Line and is used primarily for stabling units, heavy maintenance and cleaning units both internally and externally. It is owned by Network Rail and operated by Stadler.

Operation of Kirkdale depot was transferred from Merseyrail to Stadler Rail Service UK in October 2017. The depot is Stadler Rail's United Kingdom headquarters and the majority of the company's UK workforce will be based at this site. At Kirkdale, Stadler Rail is responsible for their maintenance setup and staff at the Norwich Crown Point maintenance depot, Glasgow Subway and the future Tyne and Wear Metro maintenance and staff.
The site was extended and uprated. Work finished on an extensive re-build in November 2019, allowing the depot to become the main maintenance hub for the new Class 777 fleet.

Although Kirkdale is the largest Merseyrail depot, most heavy maintenance is currently carried out at Birkenhead North TMD. This will be reversed once the new Class 777 fleet is fully introduced.

History

Bank Hall depot
The site was originally used for the Bank Hall motive power depot, which closed in 1966. The original depot was adjoined by a large area of sidings with more than thirty roads but, following the cessation of express trains operating to and from  station in May 1970, the sidings were rarely used.

Rebuild as Kirkdale depot
In 1976, when the new Loop and Link tunnels were being constructed to replace the surface station at Liverpool Exchange, the sidings were lifted and transformed into a modern maintenance depot, which was named after the nearby station. A new shed with four roads was constructed, with inspection pits under the tracks. Each road is long enough to house two three-car sets coupled together. A new carriage wash plant was also built so that units could be driven through and cleaned in a very short amount of time. This is the only active washing plant on Merseyrail, with the other washing plant at Birkenhead North being destroyed by consistent vandalism.

In 2006, a brand new wheel lathe was installed at Kirkdale in an area of the depot which was formerly used for the storage of departmental equipment.

Second rebuild
As part of the overall fleet replacement project, which will cost £460 million, both Kirkdale and Birkenhead North depots will be upgraded to a standard which will be capable of maintaining the new trains.

In March 2017, Camberley-based construction company BAM Nuttall announced that they had been successful in winning a £20 million contract to refurbish Birkenhead North and rebuild the depot at Kirkdale. The depot is operated by Stadler Rail Service UK, a subsidiary of the new fleet's manufacturer, and has a driver training simulator, maintenance shed and washing and stabling facilities for up to 30 trains. Construction of the new facilities commenced in October 2017, with work completed by November 2019, in time for the delivery and testing of the new fleet.

Allocation
Currently,  and  electric multiple units are based at Kirkdale depot, and regularly stabled in the back sidings near  station. In 2006, a new small diesel shunter was allocated to the depot to take sets into the new wheel lathe. From 2020 onwards,  units will be allocated here.

Previously, battery locomotives and Class 73 locos have been stored at the depot in the past for sandite duties in the winter. Network Rail stables its MPV diesel unit(s) here occasionally during the leaf fall season.

References

Sources

External links

 Overhead view of Kirkdale TMD

Railway depots in England
Rail transport in Liverpool